The Australia national cricket team toured India between 10 October to 2 November 2013, playing a Twenty20 International match and seven-match One Day International series against India. Due to an ongoing back injury, Australian captain Michael Clarke was replaced by Callum Ferguson and George Bailey captained the side. During the second ODI match, all of the first five Australian batsmen made a score of fifty or more, a feat which no side had previously done. In the second match, India chased down the target of 360 runs to win, making this the second highest run-chase to win an ODI game. Two weeks later in the sixth match, India again chased down the Australian total of 350 runs to record the third highest run-chase to win a game. Coincidentally, all three highest run chases had come against Australia. In the seventh and final match, Indian batsman Rohit Sharma became the third man to make a double-century in ODI cricket, when he scored 209 from 158 balls. His innings included 16 sixes, the most in an ODI innings beating the previous record of 15 held by Australian cricketer Shane Watson. The record was later broken by England's Eoin Morgan who hit 17 sixes against Afghanistan in 2019.

Squads

Only T20I

ODI series

1st ODI

2nd ODI

A historic match in ODI history unfolded as Australia elected to bat on a high scoring pitch. Aaron Finch completed his half-century and was well on his way when he was run out by Suresh Raina. After getting to his fifty, Shane Watson was soon dismissed by Vinay Kumar on 59. Phillip Hughes fell 17 runs short of his 3rd hundred and was dismissed by Ravichandran Ashwin. Australian captain George Bailey and Glenn Maxwell both scored fifty and Australia ended their innings on 359/5 with George Bailey standing not out on 92. This was the first instance of all of the top five batsmen scoring at least 50 runs in an ODI, the second instance happened 7 years later in 2020.

India then started nicely and compiled 100 runs in just 16.2 overs with the loss of no wicket.
Both openers Shikhar Dhawan and Rohit Sharma completed their fifties and added 176 runs for the first wicket before Dhawan got caught behind off James Faulkner. Virat Kohli then came to the crease and was dropped on the first ball. Kohli then got a good start and completed his half century in 27 Balls. Rohit got to his 3rd hundred in 100 balls, and Kohli got the fastest hundred by any Indian batsman, the century coming in just 52 balls and India went on to win the match by 9 wickets with 38 balls to spare.

3rd ODI

4th ODI

5th ODI

6th ODI

7th ODI

This was only fourth time when Australian bowlers conceded 350+ runs in ODI, first time was against South Africa (438) and three time against India in the same series.

Statistics
Rohit Sharma was awarded the man of the series after scoring 491 runs. At the end of the series there were several changes in ICC Batsman rankings. Virat Kohli was ranked as the number 1 batsmen while George Bailey reached his career best of 3rd Spot.

Batting
Most runs

Bowling
Most wickets

References

External links
Australia in India 2013-14 at ESPNcricinfo

International cricket competitions in 2013–14
2013 in Indian cricket
2013 in Australian cricket
2013-14
Indian cricket seasons from 2000–01